Din Dong (Chinese: 癲噹) is a Hong Kong-based cartoon cat, formed by comic authors John Chan and Pam Hung. He is a very happy and positive cat with big dreams; his motto is “Impossible is possible”. He often posts illustrations to his Facebook page.
He is a multimedia creation covering animation, comics, books, DVDs, apps and household items. His show aired on Nippon BS Broadcasting.  His animation collections were picked for "Famous Animation Section" in the 34th Hong Kong International Film Festival; A Din Dong statue is on the Comic Avenue of Stars in Tsim Sha Tsui.

Biography 

Din Dong is its author's pet cat. He was a stray cat living in Hong Kong. One day, the author found this strangely welcoming cat, Din Dong then immediately became their household pet.  He is one of the happiest cat in the world, every action of him is unpredictable and hilarious, thus inspired the author to start the comic “Din Dong”. The author hope that Din Dong can let people rethink that happiness is not all related with money and materialism.

Comic books 

 Din Dong Book 1 (癲噹-神奇玫瑰花)
 Din Dong Book 2 (癲噹2-免費去旅行)

Cartoon 
Animation was produced based on original comics, every episode is around 1 minute in length, all productions are done by Postgal Workshop, with the music composed by The Pancakes.  Animation works are released in "Postgal Animation Collection" DVD, and featured in 34th Hong Kong international Film Festival.

Game 

Dindong adventure - The character's first iOS game application "Din dong adventure" is released in October 2013, created base on the comics characters inside Dindong comics.

Award 

The 4th Asiagraph (Japan, Tokyo) - Special Jury Award

External links 
 Dindong Official Website
  Dindong Facebook
  Dindong game application
 Dindong cartoons on youtube

References 

Animated characters
Fictional cats